The Kentucky Baptist Convention (KBC) is a state Baptist convention affiliated with the Southern Baptist Convention. Headquartered in Louisville, it is made up of nearly 2,400 churches and 71 local associations. Membership in its churches totals more than 780,000 people.

History
The history of Baptists in Kentucky predates the KBC, which was founded in 1837. In 1769, Squire Boone II became the first pastor to arrive west of the Allegheny Mountains. In April 1776, three months before the United States declared its independence from Great Britain, Thomas Tinsley and William Hickman conducted what is considered to be the first evangelical service west of the Alleghenies in Harrodsburg.

Affiliated universities and colleges

 Clear Creek Baptist Bible College

Affiliated organizations

 Kentucky Baptist Assemblies, Inc.
 Kentucky Baptist Foundation
 Sunrise Children's Services, formerly known as Kentucky Baptist Homes for Children
 Oneida Baptist Institute
 Western Recorder
 Kentucky Today

References

External links
 Official website

 

Conventions associated with the Southern Baptist Convention
Baptist Christianity in Kentucky
Baptist denominations established in the 19th century
Religious organizations established in 1837
1837 establishments in Kentucky
Non-profit organizations based in Louisville, Kentucky